Tangi is a town and block in Khordha district. It has a tehsil also.

The population is close to 25,000 as per the 2011 census. It is a major town in Khordha district. Tangi is 65 km away from the state capital, Bhubaneswar. Tangi has several temples, including the Raghunath temple and the Lokanath temple.

Transportation 
NH 16 runs through the town. The state capital, Bhubaneswar, is well-connected to the town by road and rail. The nearest railway station is Kalupada Ghat, located 3 km from the town. By road, Bhubaneswar can be reached in one and a half hours.

References 

Tangi is best semi urban

Cities and towns in Khordha district